"Help Is On Its Way" is a song by Australian band Little River Band, released in April 1977 as the lead single from the group's third studio album, Diamantina Cocktail. The song peaked at number one on the Australian Kent Music Report singles chart. The song also peaked at No. 14 on the Billboard Hot 100.

At the Australian 1977 King of Pop Awards, the song won Australian Record of the Year.

At the 1978 Australian Record Awards, the song won Top 40 Record of the Year.

Reception
Cash Box magazine said "Using classic chord progressions, this pop group from Australia builds carefully detailed arrangements that show case a tight vocal blend and bright guitar melodies. A strong sense of the dramatic build up geared for top40 and AOR play."

Track listings
 Australian 7" (EMI 11405)
A. "Help Is on Its Way" - 4:04
B. "Changed and Different" - 3:50

 New Zealand 7" (EMI 1064)
A. "Help Is on Its Way" - 4:04
B. "Changed and Different" - 3:50

 North American 7" (Harvest 4428)
A. "Help Is on Its Way" - 4:04
B. "The Inner Light" - 3:30	

 Dutch (EMI – 5C 006-82 380)
A. "Help Is on Its Way" - 4:04
B1. "Changed and Different" - 3:50
B2. "L.A. in the Sunshine"

Charts

Weekly charts

Year-end charts

References 

1977 singles
Little River Band songs
Number-one singles in Australia
Songs written by Glenn Shorrock
1976 songs
EMI Records singles
Harvest Records singles